Butallylonal is a barbiturate derivative invented in the 1920s. It has sedative properties, and was used primarily as an anaesthetic in veterinary medicine.  Butallylonal is considered similar in effects to pentobarbital but is longer in action, being considered an intermediate-acting barbiturate rather than short-acting.

References 

Barbiturates
Organobromides
Alkene derivatives
GABAA receptor positive allosteric modulators